Pinus × hakkodensis, the Hakkōda Pine, is a nothospecies of conifer in the family Pinaceae. It is found only in Japan. It is a natural hybrid between Pinus pumila and Pinus parviflora.

References

 Conifer Specialist Group 1998.  Pinus hakkodensis.   2006 IUCN Red List of Threatened Species.   Downloaded on 10 July 2007.

hakkodensis
Least concern plants
Taxonomy articles created by Polbot